Ruins is a Dread Zeppelin album featuring B-sides, alternate mixes and previously unreleased tracks. It was originally released exclusively to members of the Dread Zeppelin fan club in 1996, before being made available to the general public later that year.

Track listing 
 "Jailhouse Rock"
 "Hey Hey What Can I Do"
 "Woodstock" (live)
 "Communication Breakdown"
 "Rock & Roll"
 "Stir It Up" (single version)
 "Tour-Telvis: A Bad Trip"
 "Stairway to Heaven" (single version)
 "Jungle Boogie" — featuring Screamin' Jay Hawkins as "Dr. Paradox"
 "Brick House Of The Holy" (Disco version) — mashup of Brick House and Houses of the Holy
 "Takin' Care of Business" — featuring Randy Bachman
 "Disco Inferno"
 "Do The Claw (Again!)"
 "The Last Resort" (soundtrack version) — from National Lampoon's Last Resort
 "Earshot!" (The Reggae Blades)

Personnel 
The album features songs recorded both with and without lead singer Tortelvis. Tortelvis performs on tracks 1–3, 5–8, and 14 (and is sampled on track 15). Bassist Gary Putman (aka Butt-Boy and Gary B.I.B.B.) sings lead on tracks 9–13, guitarist Jah Paul Jo sings lead on "Communication Breakdown", and "Earshot!" is an instrumental performed by The Reggae Blades, a band whose members later formed Dread Zeppelin.

References 

Dread Zeppelin albums
1996 albums
Birdcage Records albums